Shirley Barber (born 23 June 1935) is an English children's author and illustrator, long resident in Australia.

Her early childhood was spent in Guernsey (Channel Islands). She had no formal art school training, but learnt designing  at a textile and wallpaper studio in London.

She emigrated to Australia in 1965, and worked for a time for Oxford University Press in Melbourne, Victoria.  She currently lives in Watsonia, a suburb of Melbourne, with her son and his family. She has been married twice; her second husband Keith Barber died in 2000.

She has written many picture books and fairy-themed colouring books, calendars and diaries, which have sold over 10 million copies as at 2008. Most of Barber's books feature fairies and animals. Her books are mainly set in picturesque woods. Her books have been published in 18 languages.

References

Sources
Shirley Barber's Site
Australian Fantasy Art

Living people
1935 births
English children's writers
English illustrators
Australian children's book illustrators
Australian children's writers
Australian women illustrators
Australian illustrators
Guernsey people
English emigrants to Australia
Writers from Melbourne